Yarumá is an extinct and poorly attested Cariban language. Kaufman (2007) placed it in his Arara branch, as does Gildea (1998).

According to Carvalho (2020), Yarumá forms part of the Kampot dialect cluster along with Ikpeng, Apiaká do Tocantins, Parirí, and Arára.

References

Cariban languages
Extinct languages